| num_episodes         = 
}}
| list_episodes        = 
| executive_producer   = 
| company              = 
| network              = 
| released          = 
| related = Marvel Studios Special Presentations
}}
The Marvel Cinematic Universe (MCU) television series are American superhero television shows based on characters that appear in publications by Marvel Comics. They are set in, or inspired by, the shared universe of the MCU film franchise.

The MCU first expanded to television after the creation of Marvel Television in 2010, with that studio producing 12 series with ABC Studios and its production division ABC Signature Studios from September 2013 to October 2020. These premiered across broadcast, streaming, and cable respectively on ABC, Netflix and Hulu, and Freeform. The main ABC series were inspired by the films and featured film characters, and were referred to as the "Marvel Heroes" series. A connected group of series for Netflix were called the "Marvel Knights" series, and crossed over with each other. Young adult-focused series were produced for Freeform and Hulu, while the latter also had a group of series called "Adventure into Fear" planned before Marvel Television was shut down in December 2019.

Marvel Studios—the production studio behind the films—began developing their own series in 2018 for the streaming service Disney+. The first of these series premiered in January 2021, as part of the franchise's Phase Four, with seven more having also been released, concluding in October 2022. At least five series and two continuing seasons are expected in Phase Five beginning in 2023, with at least six series and two continuing seasons also in development. The phases also include Marvel Studios Special Presentation television specials. Some series are focused on supporting characters from the films, while others center on new characters that later appear in films. The Marvel Studios series have much larger budgets than the Marvel Television series, and interconnect with the films in a way that the Marvel Television series did not. Several actors from the Marvel Television series have reprised their roles for Marvel Studios productions since Marvel Television was shut down.

Development

Launch of Marvel Television 
In June 2010, Marvel Television was launched with Jeph Loeb as head. The studio began producing television series inspired by the Marvel Cinematic Universe (MCU) film franchise, though it had to be aware of Marvel Studios' plans for the films so as not to interfere when introducing someone or something to the universe. In August 2015, Marvel Studios was integrated into the Walt Disney Studios with President Kevin Feige reporting to Walt Disney Studios chairman Alan F. Horn instead of Marvel Entertainment CEO Isaac Perlmutter, while Marvel Television remained under Perlmutter's control. This was seen as widening the existing divide between the Marvel film and television divisions, and making it unlikely that the films would acknowledge the series' events and characters. By that point, the only Marvel Television series that had significant involvement from Marvel Studios was Agent Carter.

Transition to Marvel Studios 
By September 2018, Marvel Studios was developing several limited series for Disney's new streaming service Disney+, to be centered on "second tier" characters from the MCU films who had not and were unlikely to star in their own films; the actors who portrayed the characters in the films reprise their roles for the series. Feige was taking a "hands-on role" in each series' development, focusing on "continuity of story" with the films and "handling" the returning actors. The Guardians of the Galaxy Holiday Special (2022), a Marvel Studios Special Presentation, was the first piece of content Marvel Studios planned to create for Disney+. Loeb said Marvel Television would continue to develop new MCU series, including their own Disney+ series. In March 2019, Feige said the Marvel Studios series would take characters from the films, change them, and see those changes reflected in future films; new characters introduced in the series could also go on to appear in films. By September 2019, many of Marvel Television's existing series were cancelled or ending, and several developing projects did not move forward. Variety reported that the industry perception of these events was that Marvel Television was being phased out in favor of the new Marvel Studios series, which had access to well-known MCU characters. The new series also had reported budgets of $100–150 million each, which were much larger than the Marvel Television series. A month later, Feige was named Chief Creative Officer of Marvel Entertainment, with Marvel Television moving under Marvel Studios and executives at Marvel Television reporting to Feige. Loeb was expected to leave Marvel by the end of the year.

In December, Feige referred to the Marvel Studios series as "a new type of cinematic [story] that we haven't done before", going on to say, "for the first time ... the MCU will be on your TV screen at home on Disney+ and interconnect with the movies and go back and forth". The next day, Marvel Television announced that it would complete work on its existing television series but would stop developing new projects. The division was set to shut down, with several executives moving to Marvel Studios to oversee the completion of existing series including executive producer Karim Zreik. Other staff were laid off, while Loeb was set to remain with the company until the handover was completed. Zreik left Marvel Studios in June 2020 to become the head of television for Phil Lord and Christopher Miller, whose projects include several Marvel-based series for Sony Pictures Television that are intended to connect to the superhero films of Sony's Spider-Man Universe (SSU). Television specials from Marvel Studios are marketed as "Marvel Studios Special Presentations".

Production partnerships 
In February 2021, Ryan Coogler's production company Proximity Media was set to work alongside Marvel Studios on select Disney+ series as part of a television deal with Walt Disney Television. In May, WandaVision head writer Jac Schaeffer signed a three-year overall television deal with Marvel Studios and 20th Television to develop additional Disney+ projects for the studios. In December 2021, Shang-Chi and the Legend of the Ten Rings (2021) director Destin Daniel Cretton signed a multi-year deal with Marvel Studios to develop television projects for Disney+.

Expansion to animation 
In June 2021, Marvel Studios executive Victoria Alonso said the studio's expansion to animation with the series What If...? was an opportunity to make the MCU more diverse, and the medium of animation allowed Marvel Studios to work with new companies around the world. At that time, Marvel Studios was creating an "animation branch and mini studio", known as Marvel Studios Animation, to focus on more animated content beyond What If...?, building infrastructure to handle multiple animated series at once and looking to hire around 300 new staff for production roles on a slate of Disney+ animated series. What If...? director Bryan Andrews said each additional animated series would exist "on its own term[s] and hopefully explore unexpected facets of the MCU", with Marvel Studios' Brad Winderbaum saying the studio would only tell stories that they felt needed to be told in animated form. He added that Marvel Studios was open to working with corporate siblings Pixar Animation and Walt Disney Animation on MCU content "under the right circumstances". 

During Marvel Studios Animation's panel at the 2022 San Diego Comic-Con, the projects discussed were introduced as being part of the "Marvel Animated Multiverse". Shortly after, Winderbaum said the Multiverse Saga of the MCU and its exploration of the multiverse allowed the studio to "look at alternate paths and other takes on the characters... see[ing] them expanding and growing in unforeseen, unexpected ways", which he stated was the "guiding light" for the animated projects.

Marvel Television

ABC series 

The first television series that Marvel Television developed to be part of the Marvel Cinematic Universe was Agents of S.H.I.E.L.D.; it was ordered to pilot by ABC in August 2012. In January 2014, the series Agent Carter was announced; it was canceled in May 2016. That November, Marvel and IMAX Corporation announced Inhumans, based on the species of the same name, after a planned film starring the characters was removed from Marvel Studios' slate. ABC canceled the series in May 2018. In July 2019, the seventh season of Agents of S.H.I.E.L.D. was announced to be its last. Loeb explained a month later that Marvel categorized its ABC series as the "Marvel Heroes" series due to their close connections to the MCU films, especially with the main characters of both Agents of S.H.I.E.L.D. and Agent Carter having originated in films.

Netflix series 

By October 2013, Marvel was preparing four drama series and a miniseries to present to video on demand services and cable providers, with Netflix, Amazon, and WGN America expressing interest. Disney announced the next month that it would provide Netflix with live-action series based on Daredevil, Jessica Jones, Iron Fist, and Luke Cage, leading to a crossover miniseries based on the Defenders. In April 2016, Marvel and Netflix ordered The Punisher as a spin-off from Daredevil. Netflix had canceled all of the series by the end of February 2019; the characters could not appear in any non-Netflix series or films for at least two years following the cancellations. Loeb said in August 2019 that Marvel Television categorized the Netflix series internally as the "Marvel Street-Level Heroes" or "Marvel Knights". All series were no longer available on Netflix starting March 1, 2022, due to Netflix's license for the series ending and Disney regaining the rights. They all began streaming on Disney+ from March 16, 2022, where they were collected under the title "The Defenders Saga".

Young adult series 

At San Diego Comic-Con 2011, Loeb announced a series based on the Marvel Comics characters Cloak and Dagger was in development; Freeform ordered the project to series in April 2016. That August, Hulu ordered a new series based on the comics group the Runaways. Marvel initially said there were no plans to crossover these series, but Cloak and Dagger were announced to be appearing in the third season of Runaways in August 2019. Loeb explained that Marvel categorized Runaways and Cloak & Dagger as its "YA", or "young adult", franchise, and said Marvel Television's push into the young adult genre was in response to Marvel Studios doing the same with Spider-Man. Loeb hoped there would be further crossovers between the two series, but Cloak and Dagger was canceled in October 2019, followed by Runaways that November.

Adventure into Fear 

Hulu ordered two series based on Ghost Rider and the siblings Daimon and Ana Helstrom in May 2019, intending to build an interconnected universe between the two in a similar fashion to Marvel's Netflix shows. Marvel announced the series as the cornerstone of the "Spirits of Vengeance", and Loeb said they were moving into a new, "chilling" corner of the Marvel Universe. Loeb revealed in August that Marvel was now referring to these series collectively as "Adventure into Fear", and said more series under the banner were in development. A month later, Hulu decided not to move forward with Ghost Rider due to creative differences. When Marvel Television was folded into Marvel Studios in December, the studio said production on Helstrom would be completed but no further series would be developed. Helstrom was canceled a year later in December 2020.

Crossovers to feature films

Under Marvel Television 

Agents of S.H.I.E.L.D. executive producer Jeffrey Bell revealed at the show's 2014 PaleyFest panel that the producers and writers were able to read the screenplays for upcoming MCU films to know where the universe was headed. He noted that since the films have to be "big" and move "quickly through a lot of huge pieces", it was beneficial for the films to have the television series fill in any "gaps" for them. His fellow executive producer Jed Whedon explained that each Marvel project is intended to stand alone first before there is any interweaving, and noted that the series has to be aware of Marvel Studios' plans for the films so as not to interfere when introducing someone or something to the universe. Bell said this was preferable so that people who do not watch the films could still follow the series, and vice versa. Joss Whedon noted that this process meant the television series got the "leftovers".

In October 2014, Feige said the opportunity "certainly" existed for characters in the Netflix series to appear in Avengers: Infinity War (2018). In March 2015, Loeb said Marvel Television would have to "earn" the ability to have the Netflix series cross over with the films and ABC series, adding that each series had to be established and defined on its own before crossovers could occur. In September 2015, Feige elaborated on the films referencing the television series, saying it would be "inevitable at some point" but noted the timing would be difficult given how the production schedule for the series allowed them to be "more nimble and faster" to produce things that could align with the films while the long development period for a film would make it difficult to reference events of a series.

Loeb reiterated in July 2016 the issue of scheduling by saying "if I'm shooting a television series and that's going to go on over a six-month or eight-month period, how am I going to get [a television series actor] to be able to go be in a movie?" This would be less of an issue if characters were making minor cameo appearances, but Loeb explained that Marvel was not interested in cameos and Easter eggs just for the sake of fan service, which could detract from the story being told; "Our feeling is that the connection isn't just whether or not somebody is walking into a movie or walking out of a television show. It's connected in the way that the shows come from the same place, that they are real, that they are grounded." Eric Carroll, producer on Spider-Man: Homecoming (2017), felt with the introduction of Queens-based Spider-Man to the MCU that it "would be really fun" to make mention of the Defenders based in Manhattan, adding, "it's definitely a card I would love to see played, if not sooner rather than later". In January 2017, Vincent D'Onofrio, who portrays Wilson Fisk / Kingpin in Daredevil, said he was open to appearing in the films, but believed it would most likely not happen. D'Onofrio cited Feige's previous reasoning as well as the fact that the films already had difficulty handling the large number of characters they had. In March 2017, Anthony Mackie, who portrays Sam Wilson / Falcon in the films, felt a crossover between the films and television series "wouldn't work at all" given they are "different universes, different worlds, different companies, different designs" and that "Kevin Feige is very specific about how he wants the Marvel Universe to be seen in the film world". That May, Feige noted that a character appearing in a television series would not necessarily exclude them from appearing in a film, adding that "at some point, there's going to be a crossover. Crossover, repetition, or something." Regarding the potential for the Avengers to learn in the films that Phil Coulson is alive, Loeb stated, "It's certainly something that will get resolved, and it may get resolved in a very surprising way."

Loeb said in July 2017 that Marvel Television had no plans for series to cross over across networks. Specifically for the similarly themed Cloak & Dagger, New Warriors, and Runaways, which all deal with young heroes, Loeb noted, "You'll see things that comment on each other; we try to touch base wherever we can... things that are happening in L.A. [where Runaways is set] are not exactly going to be affecting what's happening in New Orleans [where Cloak & Dagger is set]... It's being aware of it and trying to find a way for it to be able to discuss in a way that makes sense." He added in October that scheduling of each series factors into why crossovers between them are more difficult to pull off, and that network "feelings" need to be considered. He also spoke on why the television series do not show Avengers Tower as it appears in the films when they depict New York City and stated that Marvel Television wanted to be "less specific" about the television characters' relationships to the tower because that "helps the audience understand that this could be on any street corner" and that the characters could be in an area of the city where you would not be able to see the tower, even though it exists. In June 2018, speaking to how the MCU television series would be affected by the events of Avengers: Infinity War, Loeb noted that "For the most part our stories will take place before Thanos clicked his fingers. A lot of that has to do with production and when we are telling our stories versus when the movies come out." In April 2019, actor James D'Arcy appeared in Avengers: Endgame, reprising his role of Edwin Jarvis from the television series Agent Carter. This marked the first time a character introduced in an MCU television series appears in an MCU film.

Speaking about how the Marvel Television series fit within the larger MCU timeline, Loeb noted, "We don't want to ever do something in our show[s] which contradicts what's happening in the movies. The movies are the lead dog. They're setting the timeline for the MCU and what's going on. Our job is to navigate within that world." The Roxxon Corporation, which had been featured in the Iron Man films, is referenced in multiple Marvel Television series, with Adam Barnhardt of ComicBook.com calling it "the go-to Easter egg for most shows involved in the Marvel Television sphere".

Under Marvel Studios 
In March 2021, the Darkhold appeared in WandaVision, where it had a different design than the one in Agents of S.H.I.E.L.D. and Runaways. While WandaVision head writer, Jac Schaeffer, said there were no "big conversations" among the writers regarding its appearance in the Marvel Television series, director Matt Shakman said that despite the new design, he believed it was the same one seen in those series. The Darkhold was designed by the Doctor Strange in the Multiverse of Madness (2022) props team, since it reappears and has more screen time in that film. The film also showed that multiple copies of the Darkhold exist.

Following the introduction of the multiverse to the MCU in the first-season finale of Loki, Jack Shephard of Total Film suggested that Marvel Studios should announce that the Marvel Television series take place on a different timeline within that multiverse since he felt the studio was not taking the events of those series into account as part of the main timeline. In December 2021, Feige confirmed that Charlie Cox would reprise the role of Daredevil in Marvel Studios MCU productions, with Cox first reprising the role in the film Spider-Man: No Way Home (2021). Additionally, D'Onofrio first reprised his role as Kingpin in the Disney+ series Hawkeye (2021), with D'Onofrio stating he was playing the same character from Daredevil. Inhumans star Anson Mount portrayed a version of his character Blackagar Boltagon / Black Bolt from an alternate universe in Multiverse of Madness. Following Cox's appearance on She-Hulk: Attorney at Law (2022), Marvel.com described the character as "very much the same Matt Murdock audiences have come to know and love".

Marvel Studios 
All Marvel Studios series are being released on Disney+ and exist alongside the films of their respective phase. Animated series are produced by Marvel Studios Animation.

Phase Four 

Two Marvel Studios Special Presentation television specials are also included in Phase Four.

Phase Five

Future 

At any given time, Marvel Studios has future television series planned five-to-six years out from what they have announced. By December 2020, after announcing series through the end of 2022, future series were planned through 2028. Marvel Studios was taking a slower developmental timeline for future series, such as the upcoming Nova series, by February 2023 amid Disney's larger decision to scale back content output and costs.

Untitled Wakanda series 
In February 2021, a drama series set in Wakanda was revealed to be in development from Ryan Coogler, writer and director of Black Panther (2018) and Black Panther: Wakanda Forever (2022), through his company Proximity Media. By that May, Danai Gurira had signed a deal to reprise her role as Okoye, the head of the Dora Milaje, in the series, which was said to be an origin spin-off for the character. In January 2023, Gurira confirmed there had been discussions surrounding an Okoye-led series.

Spider-Man: Freshman Year and Spider-Man: Sophomore Year 
Peter Parker's origin story and early days using the Spider-Man persona are explored while Norman Osborn becomes his mentor.

In November 2021, the animated series Spider-Man: Freshman Year was announced, with Jeff Trammell serving as head writer and executive producer. The series features a style that "celebrates" and pays homage to the early Spider-Man comics. The first season of Spider-Man: Freshman Year is scheduled to be released in 2024, while a second season, titled Spider-Man: Sophomore Year, is in development.

Spider-Man: Freshman Year is set in an alternate reality from the main MCU continuity in which Norman Osborn is Peter Parker's mentor instead of Tony Stark. Charlie Cox voices Matt Murdock / Daredevil, reprising the role from previous MCU media. The series features Osborn and Otto Octavius / Doctor Octopus, following the appearance of other versions of the characters in Spider-Man: No Way Home (2021), along with Mac Gargan / Scorpion and Dr. Stephen Strange from prior MCU media, and Nico Minoru, who appeared in the Marvel Television series Runaways (2017–2019).

Marvel Zombies 

A new generation of heroes battle against zombies.

In November 2021, a Marvel Zombies animated series was announced, with Bryan Andrews directing and Zeb Wells serving as head writer, and is based on the comic book series Marvel Zombies. It is a continuation of the reality first introduced in the What If...? episode "What If... Zombies?!" and includes characters introduced in Phase Four of the MCU. Marvel Zombies is scheduled to be released in 2024, and will consist of four episodes.

Wonder Man 
In December 2021, Destin Daniel Cretton signed a multi-year deal with Marvel Studios to develop television projects for Disney+, with a comedy series already in development at that point, through Cretton's company Family Owned. In June 2022, the series was revealed to be in early development and titled Wonder Man, centered on the character Simon Williams / Wonder Man, with Andrew Guest joining to develop the series along with serving as head writer. In October, Yahya Abdul-Mateen II was cast as the title character. Filming is expected to begin in late March 2023, with Cretton and Stella Meghie directing episodes of the series. Wonder Man is expected to debut on Disney+ during the 2023–24 television season.

Ben Kingsley reprises his MCU role as Trevor Slattery.

Untitled Nova series 
In March 2022, a project featuring the character Richard Rider / Nova was revealed to be in development, with Sabir Pirzada writing. Production Weekly had previously included an untitled space-centered series in their report of upcoming projects in development, later confirming the untitled series was the Nova project. Marvel Studios was taking a slower developmental timeline for the series by February 2023 amid Disney's larger decision to scale back content output and costs.

Vision Quest 

The series centers on The Vision as he attempts to regain his memory and humanity.

In October 2022, a second spin-off from WandaVision (2021) centered on the character The Vision was revealed to be in development and titled Vision Quest. Jac Schaeffer was set as head writer and executive producer, with Paul Bettany reprising his role.

Other 
A third season of What If...? is in development. By September 2022, Brian Kesinger was attached to direct an animated series for Marvel Studios. By that November, Coogler's Proximity Media was revealed to be developing several series set in Wakanda. Additionally, after the shut down of Marvel Television, ABC said that it remained committed to featuring Marvel content. In January 2020, ABC Entertainment president Karey Burke said that talks were beginning with Feige and Marvel Studios about what a Marvel Studios series on ABC would be, but she noted that Marvel's focus was on the Disney+ series.

Series approach 
Feige described Marvel Studios' approach to their television series in January 2021, explaining that streaming on Disney+ gave Marvel Studios flexibility with the formats for each series. He said some were being developed as "one off" miniseries that were intended to lead into feature films, though additional seasons could be added to these in the future. Other series were always intended to cover multiple seasons while still being connected to the films, such as Loki. These could have several years between the release of seasons, similar to series like Game of Thrones and Stranger Things. Feige added that each miniseries or season was intended to be around six hours of content, but this would be split in different ways depending on the story being told, such as six hour-long episodes, or nine or ten half-hour episodes. Marvel Studios' earliest series were directed by a single person, but later series have multiple directors taking on different numbers of episodes. Feige said this happened due to a combination of logistics, the needs of each story, and the studio's "own internal learnings of making longform television". He said the studio would continue varying the number of directors on future series as needed.

Marvel Studios uses the term "head writer" instead of the traditional showrunner title, since they approach their television series as if they were six hour-long films. They encourage the series' directors to be in the writers room and part of the creative process (much like the feature films) in addition to Feige and the Marvel Studios executives assigned to each series. This approach was confirmed by WandaVision head writer Jac Schaeffer, The Falcon and the Winter Soldier director Kari Skogland, and Loki season one director Kate Herron, with Skogland describing the approach as "effective and efficient" since the series are too much for a single showrunner to take on. Despite the head writer term, each series has multiple writers and a writers room that the head writer leads, and they also use "created for television by" credits for the head writers. Explaining the decision-making process and hierarchy for Marvel Studios' first three series, Loki season one head writer Michael Waldron said the head writer of each series would have final say on creative decisions before filming began. At that point, the series shifted to a "more feature centric model" where the director takes on the role that a traditional showrunner might have and has the final say for creative decisions while on set and in post-production, with the head writer still present on set for any necessary rewrites and during post-production.

Following the release of the Phase Four series, Feige noted Marvel Studios was open to experimenting in their future series with having more episodic, "self-contained" episodes, rather than the series' narrative being a larger story split into various episodes; he pointed to Daredevil: Born Again as a particular example where they would try this.

See also 
 List of Marvel Cinematic Universe television series actors (Marvel Television)
 List of Marvel Cinematic Universe television series actors (Marvel Studios)
 List of television series based on Marvel Comics publications
 List of Marvel Cinematic Universe films
 Outline of the Marvel Cinematic Universe

Notes

References 

 
Television series
Lists of television series